Tesma nigrapex is a moth in the  subfamily Arctiinae. It was described by Strand in 1912. It is found in Cameroon, Equatorial Guinea and Nigeria.

References

Natural History Museum Lepidoptera generic names catalog

Moths described in 1912
Lithosiini